Jielong 1 (meaning "agile dragon", also known as Smart Dragon 1, SD-1), is a solid fueled orbital launch vehicle developed by China Academy of Launch Vehicle Technology's subsidiary China Rocket to launch up to 150 kg to a 700 km altitude sun-synchronous orbit. The rocket is 19.5 meters tall, 1.2 meters in diameter and weighs 23.1 metric tons. It is a solid fuel, 4 stage orbital rocket. The development of the rocket took 18 months (initiated in February 2018); the rocket uses propulsion technology from Chinese missile programs. The program aims to produce a launch vehicle with launch price per mass of $US 30,000/kg, or $6 million for the launch.

The launch vehicle features an inverted-position fourth stage motor and payload space during the initial portion of the launch sequence; the stack rotates to front after third stage separation.

The maiden flight of Jielong 1 on 17 August 2019, 04:11 UTC was successful. It delivered three small satellites into polar orbit. The satellites were the Xingshidai 5 Earth observation satellite, Tianqi 2 experimental satellite and a third small Earth observing satellite Qiancheng 01 from Qiansheng Exploration Technology Co. Ltd. The launch took place from Jiuquan, with the rocket taking off from a road-mobile transporter.

List of launches

References

Vehicles introduced in 2019
2019 in China
2019 in technology